The historic Town of Empire is a Statutory Town located in Clear Creek County, Colorado, United States. The town population was 345 at the 2020 United States Census, a +22.34% increase since the 2010 United States Census. The town is a former mining settlement that flourished during the Colorado Silver Boom in the late 19th century. Empire is now a part of the Denver–Aurora–Lakewood, CO Metropolitan Statistical Area and the Front Range Urban Corridor.

It is located in the valley of Clear Creek west of Denver, on the north side of the valley. The town consists of several commercial establishments and residents. U.S. Highway 40 passes through the town as its ascends towards Berthoud Pass, putting the town on the direct route between Denver and Middle Park.

History
A post office called Empire City was established in 1861, and the name was changed to Empire in 1886.  The town was named after New York, the "Empire State". Empire was incorporated in 1882.

Geography

West of the town of Empire is a group of high summits along the Continental Divide, including Mount Flora, Mount Eva, Parry Peak, James Peak, Colorado Mines Peak, and Mount Bancroft, named for Frederick J. Bancroft who was noted for his public health and historical work for the state.

At the 2020 United States Census, the town had a total area of  including  of water.

Climate
This climate type is dominated by the winter season, a long, bitterly cold period with short, clear days, relatively little precipitation mostly in the form of snow, and low humidity.

Demographics

As of the census of 2000, there were 355 people, 163 households, and 88 families residing in the town. The racial makeup of the town was 94.37% White, 3.10% Native American, 0.28% Asian, 0.28% from other races, and 1.97% from two or more races. Hispanic or Latino of any race were 3.66% of the population.

There were 163 households, out of which 30.7% had children under the age of 18 living with them, 39.3% were married couples living together, 11.7% had a female householder with no husband present, and 46.0% were non-families. 39.3% of all households were made up of individuals, and 6.7% had someone living alone who was 65 years of age or older.  The average household size was 2.18 and the average family size was 2.99.

In the town, the population was spread out, with 27.0% under the age of 18, 4.2% from 18 to 24, 30.7% from 25 to 44, 32.1% from 45 to 64, and 5.9% who were 65 years of age or older.  The median age was 40 years. For every 100 females, there were 112.6 males.  For every 100 females age 18 and over, there were 121.4 males.

The median income for a household in the town was $32,159, and the median income for a family was $43,750. Males had a median income of $40,313 versus $29,500 for females. The per capita income for the town was $20,417.  About 10.5% of families and 11.0% of the population were below the poverty line, including 11.4% of those under age 18 and none of those age 65 or over.

Points of interest

 Peck House - Historic hotel and restaurant.
 Hard Rock Cafe - This is the original, dating from 1934, and named for the hard rock miners that were its early customers.  It predates and is not affiliated with the chain of restaurants that also call themselves the Hard Rock Cafe.

In fiction
Empire is the setting of Bonnie Nadzam's short story, titled "Empire" after the town.

See also

Colorado
Bibliography of Colorado
Index of Colorado-related articles
Outline of Colorado
List of counties in Colorado
List of municipalities in Colorado
List of places in Colorado
List of statistical areas in Colorado
Front Range Urban Corridor
North Central Colorado Urban Area
Denver-Aurora, CO Combined Statistical Area
Denver-Aurora-Lakewood, CO Metropolitan Statistical Area
Arapaho National Forest
Colorado Silver Boom

References

Ruggles, Eleanor. The West Going Heart. Norton, 1959.

External links

Town of Empire website
CDOT map of the Town of Empire

Towns in Clear Creek County, Colorado
Towns in Colorado
Denver metropolitan area